Theatrical Novel is a 2002 Russian comedy-drama film directed by Oleg Babitsky and Yury Goldin.

Plot 
The film tells the story of the production of Bulgakov's play on the stage of the Moscow Art Theater.

Cast 
 Igor Larin as Sergey Leontievich Maksudov
 Maksim Sukhanov as Pyotr Bombardov / Ivan Vasilyevitch
 Nikolay Chindyaykin
 Valeriy Zolotukhin
 Natalya Kolyakanova as Ludmila Silvestrovna Pryakhina
 Emmanuil Vitorgan as Gavriil Stepanovich
 Oksana Mysina as Poliksena Vasilyevna Toropetskaya
 Valentin Smirnitskiy as Ivan Aleksandrovich Poltoratskyj
 Dmitry Maryanov as Foma Strizh
 Vyacheslav Grishechkin as Makar Rvatsky

References

External links 
 

2002 films
2000s Russian-language films
Russian comedy-drama films
Russian mystery films
2002 comedy-drama films